Sebastian Faisst (7 March 1988 in Alpirsbach (Baden-Württemberg), Germany – 3 March 2009 in Schaffhausen, Switzerland) was a German handball player, who played for the professional club TSV Dormagen since 2008, coming from the professional club HSG Konstanz and was a member and captain of the German under-21 national handball team.  He died in Schaffhausen during a U-21 match against Switzerland of heart failure.

References 
 Bild article (German)
 TSV Dormagen in Trauer  Focus article (German)

1988 births
2009 deaths
People from Freudenstadt (district)
Sportspeople from Karlsruhe (region)
Sport deaths in Switzerland
German male handball players